The Iori Plateau (ivris zegani), also known as Gare-Kakheti Plateau (გარე კახეთის ზეგანი, gare kakhet'is zegani) is a plateau between the Kura and Alazani rivers in southeastern Georgia, transected by the Iori River. The elevation of the plateau is between 200 m and 900 m. The soils are predominantly chernozem. A significant portion of the plateau is occupied by steppes, such as Shiraki Plain in its eastern part.

See also 
 David Gareja monastery complex

References 

Geography of Kakheti
Plateaus of Georgia (country)